The 1968 Orange Bowl was the 34th edition of the college football bowl game, played at the Orange Bowl in Miami, Florida, on Monday, January 1. The third-ranked Oklahoma Sooners of the Big Eight Conference defeated the Tennessee Volunteers of the Southeastern Conference (SEC), 26–24.

Teams

Oklahoma

Oklahoma won all seven games in Big Eight Conference play for their first title since 1962 and first Orange Bowl since 1963. The only blemish was a two-point loss to rival Texas at the Cotton Bowl in Dallas on October 14.

Entering his second season as head coach, 37-year-old Jim Mackenzie suffered a fatal heart attack at his Norman home in late April. Assistant coach Chuck Fairbanks, age 33, was promoted several days later.

Tennessee

After a four-point loss at UCLA in the season opener, Tennessee won nine consecutive games. They were perfect in Southeastern Conference play and were champions for the first time since 1956. It was Tennessee's first Orange Bowl since 1947.

Tennessee did not get to play top-ranked USC in the Rose Bowl; the Trojans met #4 Indiana, the Big Ten co-champion, due to the Pac-8 – Big Ten contract.

The Volunteers' soccer-style placekicker Karl Kremser was a war refugee from Germany.

Game summary
This was the fourth straight year for a night kickoff at the Orange Bowl, following the Rose Bowl. Both teams wore their home jerseys, Oklahoma in crimson and Tennessee in orange.

Quarterback Bob Warmack gave the Sooners a 7–0 lead on his ten-yard touchdown run in the first quarter. He added a twenty-yard touchdown pass to Eddie Hinton in the second quarter, and running back Steve Owens scored from a yard out to make it 19–0 at halftime.

Held scoreless until midway into the third quarter, Tennessee's  Jimmy Glover returned an interception 36 yards for a touchdown. Two minutes later, another interception by Jim Weatherford set up a five-yard touchdown run by Charley Fulton (19–14).

A Karl Kremser field goal from 26 yards closed the gap to 19–17 early in the fourth quarter.  Oklahoma went up 26–17 on Bob Stephenson's 25-yard interception return for a touchdown. Tennessee then answered with quarterback Dewey Warren's touchdown plunge to pull back to two points at 26–24.

Oklahoma was at their own 43-yard line with just under two minutes remaining. First-year head coach Fairbanks opted to go for the first down, despite only leading by two points. Owens was given the ball, but was stopped by linebacker Jack Reynolds, and the ball went back to the Volunteers. With seven seconds to go, Tennessee sent Kremser in to attempt a 43-yard field goal, but his kick sailed wide right, and Oklahoma won.

Scoring
First quarter
Oklahoma – Bob Warmack 7-yard run (Mike Vachon kick)
Second quarter
Oklahoma – Eddie Hinton 20-yard pass from Warmack (kick failed)
Oklahoma – Steve Owens 1-yard run (run failed)
Third quarter
Tennessee – Jimmy Glover 36-yard interception return (Karl Kremser kick)
Tennessee – Charley Fulton 5-yard run (Kremser kick)
Fourth quarter
Oklahoma – Bob Stephenson 23-yard interception return (Vachon kick)
Tennessee – Kremser 26-yard FG
Tennessee – Dewey Warren 1-yard run (Kremser kick)

Statistics
{| class=wikitable style="text-align:center"
! Statistics !!  Oklahoma   !! Tennessee
|-
|First Downs ||18 ||18
|- 
|Rushes–yards ||50–203 ||44–172
|-
|Passing yards	||107	||160
|-
|Passes (C–A–I) ||9–18–3 || 12–23–2
|-
|Total Offense	||68–310||67–332
|-
|Punts–average	||5–47.0 ||2–32.0
|-
|Fumbles–lost 	||0–0 ||1–1
|-
|Turnovers || 3 || 3
|-
|Penalties–yards ||2–10	||4–27
|}

Aftermath
The two teams received a then-record payout of about $285,000 each.

Oklahoma next played in the Orange Bowl in 1976; Tennessee waited  three decades, returning in 1998.

References

Orange Bowl
Orange Bowl
Oklahoma Sooners football bowl games
Tennessee Volunteers football bowl games
January 1968 sports events in the United States
Orange Bowl